The Festival international du polar de Lyon, or Quais du polar is a festival of crime fiction in print and film.  It has been held annually in Lyons since 2005.

Prizes 
The festival awards several prizes; the readers' prize, the comic thriller prize, the Prix du Polar Européen, a prize for the best new story and one for the best European short film.

Literary festivals in France